Crenatula picta is a species of marine bivalves in the family Pteriidae. It is known from Madagascar and the Red Sea.

References

External links 
  
 Crenatula picta at Biolib.cz
 Crenatula picta at the World Register of Marine Species (WoRMS)

Pteriidae
Bivalves described in 1791
Molluscs of Madagascar
Fauna of the Red Sea